Chontales may refer to:
 Chontales Department, Nicaragua
 Chontal Maya people, Tabasco, Mexico